Angelique Widjaja was the defending champion, but lost to Ľubomíra Kurhajcová in the second round.

Henrieta Nagyová won the title in an all-Slovak final.

Seeds

Draw

Finals

Top half

Bottom half

References

Singles
Volvo Women's Open - Singles
 in women's tennis